Rosalba Vido (born 2 January 1953) is an Italian former professional tennis player.

Vido, the daughter of Davis Cup player Gino, represented the Italy Federation Cup team between 1972 and 1977, winning four singles and two doubles rubbers. Her 1975 campaign included wins over Patricia Medrado and Mariana Simionescu, then a loss to Evonne Goolagong in her only quarterfinal tie.

Her career highlights include a singles main draw appearance the 1972 US Open, as well as competing in the doubles at Wimbledon. She was a doubles runner-up at the 1972 Italian Open (with Gail Chanfreau) and a two-time doubles champion at the Italian Tennis Championships, in 1976 and 1977 (with Daniela Porzio).

See also
List of Italy Fed Cup team representatives

References

External links
 
 
 

1953 births
Living people
Italian female tennis players
20th-century Italian women